Mt. Fuji Records was an independent record label based in Seattle, Washington. Their roster included rock bands such as Little Brazil, The Cops and Slender Means. As of 26 November 2012, they are defunct.

Bands
 The Cops
 Little Brazil
 Slender Means
 Wintergreen
 New Candidates

See also
 List of record labels

References

External links
 Official site

Companies based in Seattle
American independent record labels
Rock record labels